Hermann Lübbe (born 31 December 1926) is a German philosopher. He is considered a member of the Ritter School.

Biography
Lübbe was born in Aurich. From 1947 to 1951, he studied philosophy, theology and sociology in Göttingen, Münster and Freiburg. Among his academic teachers were Joachim Ritter and Heinrich Scholz. From 1963 to 1969, Lübbe was professor in Bochum. Since 1966, he was also secretary of state in the education ministry of the German state North Rhine-Westphalia. In 1969, Lübbe became professor in Bielefeld and secretary of state with the minister-president of North Rhine-Westphalia. From 1971 to 1991, he was professor of philosophy and political theory in Zurich.

Lübbes philosophical work focuses on a theory of modern civilization and liberal democracy. A prominent opponent of the protests of 1968 in Germany, he analyzed the acceleration of social change and emphasized the relevance of common sense, traditional virtues, stable political institutions and religious orientations in modern, highly dynamic societies. Criticized by Jürgen Habermas as one of the leading representatives of German neoconservatism in the 1970s and 1980s, Lübbe is now widely recognized as one of the most influential German political philosophers in the last decades. Lübbe and Habermas frequently clashed about the role of political intellectuals in a liberal democracy.

Select bibliography 
 Politische Philosophie in Deutschland: Studien zu ihrer Geschichte. (1963)
 Säkularisierung: Geschichte eines ideenpolitischen Begriffs. (1965)
 Theorie und Entscheidung: Studien zum Primat der praktischen Vernunft. (1971)
 Hochschulreform und Gegenaufklärung: Analysen, Postulate, Polemik zur aktuellen Hochschul- und Wissenschaftspolitik. (1972)
 Bewusstsein in Geschichten: Studien zur Phänomenologie der Subjektivität: Mach, Husserl, Schapp, Wittgenstein (1972)
 Fortschritt als Orientierungsproblem: Aufklärung in der Gegenwart. (1975)
 Geschichtsbegriff und Geschichtsinteresse: Analytik und Pragmatik der Historie. (1977)
 Endstation Terror: Rückblick auf lange Märsche. (1978)
 Philosophie nach der Aufklärung: Von der Notwendigkeit pragmatischer Vernunft. (1980)
 Religion nach der Aufklärung. (1986, 3rd edition 2004)
 Politischer Moralismus: Der Triumph der Gesinnung über die Urteilskraft. (1987)
 Fortschrittsreaktionen: Über konservative und destruktive Modernität. 1987
 Im Zug der Zeit: Verkürzter Aufenthalt in der Gegenwart. (1992)
 Abschied vom Superstaat: Vereinigte Staaten von Europa wird es nicht geben. (1994)
 „Ich entschuldige mich.“ Das neue politische Bußritual. (2001)
 Politik nach der Aufklärung: Philosophische Aufsätze. (2001)
 Wissenschaft und Religion nach der Aufklärung: Über den kulturellen Bedeutsamkeitsverlust wissenschaftlicher Weltbilder. (2001)
 Modernisierungsgewinner: Religion, Geschichtssinn, direkte Demokratie und Moral. (2004)
 Die Zivilisationsökumene: Globalisierung kulturell, technisch und politisch. (2005)
 Vom Parteigenossen zum Bundesbürger: Über beschwiegene und historisierte Vergangenheiten. (2007)
 Hermann Lübbe im Gespräch. Wilhelm Fink: Paderborn 2010.

Further reading 
 Habermas, Jürgen, Neoconservative Culture Criticism in the United States and West Germany: An Intellectual Movement in Two Political Cultures, in: Télos 1983 (56), p. 75–89.
 Hacke, Jens, Philosophie der Bürgerlichkeit. Die liberalkonservative Begründung der Bundesrepublik. Göttingen: Vandenhoeck & Ruprecht 2006. .
 Muller, Jerry Z., German Neo-Conservatism ca. 1968–1985. Hermann Lübbe and Others, in: Jan-Werner Müller (ed.), German Ideologies since 1945. Studies in the Political Thought and Culture of the Bonn Republic, New York 2003, p. 161–184.
 Nissing, Hanns-Gregor (ed.), Hermann Lübbe. Pragmatische Vernunft nach der Aufklärung, Darmstadt: WBG 2009.

External links
 Hermann Lübbe (in German) from the online-archive of the Österreichische Mediathek

References 

21st-century German philosophers
1926 births
Living people
University of Münster alumni
University of Göttingen alumni
University of Freiburg alumni
Academic staff of Ruhr University Bochum
Academic staff of Bielefeld University
Academic staff of the University of Zurich
20th-century German philosophers
Commanders Crosses of the Order of Merit of the Federal Republic of Germany